Caiga quien caiga is a 2018 Peruvian political thriller film, based on the homonymous book written by José Ugaz. The film was directed and produced by Eduardo Guillot Meave, and starred Miguel Iza as Vladimiro Montesinos.

Plot 
In September 2000, the first vladivideo was revealed, a recording in which the presidential adviser Vladimiro Montesinos bribed Alberto Kouri, an opposition congressman, to vote for favor of the government. After that, the government of Alberto Fujimori faces a crisis that would lead to its end; Likewise, the presidential adviser is accused of corruption and persecuted by the dying Fujimori regime.

Vladimiro Montesinos flees to Panama where he is unable to obtain political asylum, so he returns to Peru. Justice issues an arrest warrant against him and the president Alberto Fujimori is part of police operations to search for him. However, Montesinos manages to escape on the sailboat Karisma to Costa Rica and then to Venezuela.

Cast 

 Miguel Iza as Vladimiro Montesinos
 Eduardo Camino as José Ugaz
 Javier Valdés as Alberto Bermúdez (Alberto Bustamante Belaúnde)
 Karina Jordán as Marina
 Kukuli Morante as Jacqueline Beltrán
 Jackie Vásquez as Matilde Pinchi Pinchi
 José Miguel Arbulú as Bologna
 Gonzalo Molina as Saul
 Alfonso Dibos as Eduardo
 Milene Vásquez as Verónica (José Ugaz's ex-wife)
 Sandro Calderon as Huaman
 Diego Carlos Seyfarth as Walter Thomas
 Marcello Rivera as Vera
 Alejandra Guerra as Laura Bozzo.
 Victor Prada
 Ana Maria Estrada
 Pietro Sibille as Vatican
 Claudio Calmet
 Percy Williams Silva

Production 
The film premiered on August 23, 2018, with Cielo Garrido as executive producer, achieving second place in a thriller on the day of its premiere, exceeding 100,000 viewers the week of its premiere.

Reception

Reviews 
The film has received mixed reviews from the specialized press, they call it very bland and boring, also that in its footage they show three sex scenes that are only fanservice and do not help the story they are trying to tell, also having poor performances and only one being saved, that of Miguel Iza as Vladimiro Montesinos.

Disputes 
In the first days of August 2018, Vladimiro Montesinos sent a notarized letter stating that the film "affects his good image." In the same way, the presenter Laura Bozzo was against the premiere of the film and announced legal measures for the use of her image and the phrase "Let the Wretch pass!".

Awards 

 National Competition for Feature Film Distribution Projects 2018 (Ministry of Culture).

References

External links 

 

2018 films
2018 thriller films
Peruvian political thriller films
2010s Spanish-language films
2010s Peruvian films
2010s political thriller films
Films based on non-fiction books
Films set in Peru
Films shot in Peru
Films about presidents
Films about political movements
Films about politicians